Teachings of Presidents of the Church is a series of books published by the Church of Jesus Christ of Latter-day Saints (LDS Church). Each book of the series briefly compiles the teachings and sermons of one of the men who has served as president of the LDS Church. The series is not complete, with 15 books having been released by August 2016. (There have been 17 presidents of the LDS Church.) The text of each book is not limited to sermons preached while the person was president of the church, but generally contain teachings given during their time as an ordained apostle.

The series began in 1997, with the release of the Brigham Young edition. The books are not being issued in the same order in which presidents served. The books are not intended to be a comprehensive collection of the words, sermons, or writings of their subjects. Church members have been encouraged to save the books and make a collection in their homes. Four and a half million copies of the 2008 adult study course, Teachings of Presidents of the Church: Joseph Smith, were printed.

The books served as a basis for many of the lessons presented in weekly church Relief Society and adult priesthood meetings. Each book was used as class curriculum for one or two calendar years, depending on the length of the book. In 2010 and 2011, the church temporarily ceased using this series for communal study at Sunday meetings and instead used a newly revised Gospel Principles manual. Sunday study of the Teachings of Presidents of the Church series resumed in 2012, but concluded at the end of 2017. 

(Beginning in 2018, adult church members use a new approach to the Sunday curriculum entitled Come Follow Me: For Melchizedek Priesthood and Relief Society. This places greater emphasis on members counseling together regarding local needs, increased study of general conference talks, and studying other topics selected by the general church leadership.)

The copyright in the books is held by Intellectual Reserve, but they are available in electronic format for free on the LDS Church's website.

Books in the series

As of 2022, no edition has been published  for Russell M. Nelson, the seventeenth church president.

References

External links
Teachings of Presidents of the Church: Official site

The Church of Jesus Christ of Latter-day Saints texts
Relief Society
1997 in Christianity
1997 books
21st-century Mormonism
20th-century Mormonism
Books about presidents of the church (LDS Church)
Works by presidents of the church (LDS Church)
Works by apostles (LDS Church)